The E.N. Charles and Lewis Arthur House, on Douglas Ave. in Las Vegas, New Mexico, was built in 1893.  It was listed on the National Register of Historic Places in 1985.

It is a wood-frame building built between 1892 and 1895.  Its hipped roof porch with columns reflects "influence of the local World's Fair Classic Style which developed after 1898. It therefore was probably added after the original construction, possibly between 1908 and 1913 when the rear room
was added.".  It had become a boarding house within 15 years of its construction.

References

National Register of Historic Places in San Miguel County, New Mexico
Houses completed in 1893